Harry Angier Hoffner, Jr. (November 27, 1934 – March 10, 2015) was an American professor of Hittitology.

Early life and education
Hoffner was born in Jacksonville, Florida to Harry Angier and Madaline Wolford Hoffner.  He studied at Princeton University, where he earned an A.B. cum laude in 1956.  Hoffner continued his studies at the Dallas Theological Seminary, obtaining a Th.M. in 1960, and then took up study at Brandeis University, earning an M.A. in 1961 and a Ph.D. in Ancient Mediterranean studies in 1963.

Academic career
His first teaching post was at Illinois' Wheaton College, where he taught Hebrew and Biblical studies from 1963 to 1964.  Hoffner returned to Brandeis in 1964, teaching ancient Near Eastern languages as an assistant professor of Anatolian studies.  He left for Yale in 1969 to be an associate professor of Assyriology and Hittitology, and in 1974 settled at the University of Chicago's Oriental Institute as a professor of Hittitology. Hoffner continued teaching and serving as executive editor of the Chicago Hittite Dictionary until his retirement in 2000. He finished his career as the John A. Wilson Professor of Hittitology Emeritus, and also served as the senior editor of the Chicago Hittite Dictionary, which he co-founded with Hans Gustav Güterbock in 1976.

Works

References

1934 births
Brandeis University alumni
Brandeis University faculty
Hittitologists
2015 deaths
People from Jacksonville, Florida
Princeton University alumni
University of Chicago faculty
Yale University faculty
Wheaton College (Illinois) faculty
Dallas Theological Seminary alumni